Bertha Mann (October 21, 1893 – December 20, 1967) was an American stage and film actress.

Early life
Mann was born in Atlanta, Georgia. She trained as a dancer in childhood, but soon found that drama was a better fit for her talents.

Career

Mann started touring with stock companies as a young actress. Broadway appearances by Mann included roles in When Claudia Smiles (1914), When the Young Vine Blooms (1915), The Weavers (1915-1916), One of Us (1918), The Crimson Alibi (1919), The Man with the Load of Mischief (1925), and The Virgin (1926). Films featuring Bertha Mann include The Blindness of Divorce (1918), All Quiet on the Western Front (1930), The Little Accident (1930), Free Love (1930), Caught Cheating (1931), Father's Son (1931), A Woman of Experience (1931), The Final Edition (1932), and Behind the Mask (1932).

During World War I Mann learned to knit to make "mufflers" for American troops, took a basic nursing course, and was active with the Stage Women's War Relief organization. She suggested that the young film industry in Los Angeles might follow the example of the theatre community in New York in supporting the war effort.

Filmography

Personal life
Mann married fellow actor Raymond Griffith in 1928. They lived in Los Angeles and raised two children together. She was widowed when Griffith died in 1957. She died ten years later, aged 74 years, in Los Angeles.

References

External links
 
 Bertha Mann's listing at IBDB.
 Bertha Mann Griffith's gravesite on Find a Grave.
 Two publicity photos of Bertha Mann, at Silent Film Still Archive.

1893 births
1967 deaths
American stage actresses
Actresses from Atlanta
American women in World War I
American film actresses
20th-century American actresses